Glasgow is an unincorporated community in Columbiana County, in the U.S. state of Ohio.

History
Glasgow was platted in 1852. The community was named after Glasgow, Scotland, the ancestral land of a large share of the first settlers. A post office called Glasgow was established in 1839, and remained in operation until 1902.

References

Unincorporated communities in Columbiana County, Ohio
1852 establishments in Ohio
Populated places established in 1852
Unincorporated communities in Ohio